Rattlesnake Island refers, variously, to the following places:

United States

 Rattlesnake Island (Clear Lake), in Lake County, California
 A previous name for Terminal Island, in Los Angeles County, California
 Rattlesnake Island (New Hampshire), in Lake Winnipesaukee
 Rattlesnake Island (Lake Erie), in Ohio

Canada
 Rattlesnake Island (Okanagan Lake), in British Columbia

Australia
 Rattlesnake Island (Queensland), in Halifax Bay, used for bombing practice